HSwMS Belos (A214) is a submarine rescue ship in the Swedish Navy's 1st Submarine flotilla. She carries the Submarine Rescue Vehicle URF. She is also capable of carrying the NATO rescue system NSRS. HSwMS Belos is currently [2017] the largest ship (by displacement) in the Swedish Navy.
HMS Belos is traditionally the name of the Swedish navy's submarine rescue vessel and she is the third ship with that name.

History
Originally built as a diving support vessel, Belos (III) was launched in 1985 at the Dutch shipyard De Hoop operated in the international offshore business named "Energy Supporter". In 1992, she was purchased for the Royal Swedish Navy, was renamed Belos (III), and has since been redesigned into an advanced diving and submarine rescue ship. A 214, HSwMS Belos (III), with the submarine rescue vessel URF was the first submarine rescue system that could perform Transfer Under Pressure (TUP) from a disabled submarine, via the rescue vessel to a decompression chamber system for treatment to avoid decompression sickness.

Normally, the ship does not anchor, but hover at the distressed submarine using her Azimuth- and bow thrusters, and the Dynamic Positioning (DP) system. Onboard Belos, an extensive array of Remotely Operated Vehicles (ROV’s), oceanographic equipment, craneage, diving-, medical-, and decompression facilities are accessible. Different sonar systems attached to the hull and towed astern of the Belos can be used for searching distressed submarines or other objects at the seabed. The Belos along with the Submarine Rescue Vessel (SRV) URF compose the backbone of the Swedish Submarine Escape and Rescue System.

HSwMS Belos (III) can perform diving and underwater tasks using wet-bell and remotely operated underwater vehicles (ROV’s). The ability to perform various types of underwater work is essential for submarine rescue operations. If the mating area to which the rescue vessel is to connect with the distressed submarine is covered by debris, fishing nets or other obstacles, these obstacles must be removed prior to mating the rescue vessel to the submarine. For smaller submarines or manned submersibles, the rescue operation may be cutting free the vessel itself if it is snagged by e.g. nets or cables and unable to surface (see AS-28). The wet-bell is used for air-diving with two divers at a time to a maximum depth of 60 m. The divers are equipped with hot-water suits, TV-cameras, and constant communication to the diving supervisor on board the Belos. A slide leads from the divers' exit point to the chamber to speed up the surface decompression process.

The underwater vehicles are all equipped with positioning systems, TV-cameras, and sonar systems, allowing them to operate in conditions of poor visibility. The maximum diving depth is 1000 m and underwater work is performed by using hydraulic manipulators with a range of interchangeable tools.
The Belos (III) has a numerous craneage capacity. For lifting, craneage with a capacity of 5, 6, 10 och 100 tons is available. In addition, an A-frame in the stern with a capacity of 55 tons is used for handling the submarine rescue vessel URF.

HSwMS Belos (III), recent improvements:

•	Initially, the 100 t crane was used for launching and recovering the URF, a method rather unreliable during rough weather, leading to the construction and installation of the 55 t A-frame aft.

•	The decompression chamber system was improved leading to a decompression capacity of 40 at a time, including rescuees, medical personnel, and chamber attendants.  The system consists of three cylinders divided into 4 main chambers.

•	Installation of TUP connection system (maximally pressurised to the equivalent of 50 msw) with direct access to the chamber system.

•	Co-operation with the Royal Navy resulted in the UK submarine Rescue Vessel LR-5 was fully operational from HSwMS Belos including TUP capacity. This cooperation is now replaced with the NATO submarine Rescue System, NSRS which is fully operational from HSMS Belos. In November 2017 the Royal Netherlands Navy joined the co-operation.

•	Improvements of the Dynamic positioning (DP) –system, a system that using thrusters can hover in the sea at a fixed position.

References 

 1st Submarine flotilla - Ubåtsräddningsfartyg 
 Swedish Armed Forces - Ubåtsräddnignsfartyg 
 Shipyard De Hoop - NB314 
 Örlogsboken 2003 

Auxiliary ships of the Swedish Navy
Naval ships of Sweden
1985 ships
Ships built in the Netherlands
Submarine rescue ships